Dan Roushar (born September 27, 1960) is an American football coach who was most recently the run game coordinator and tight ends coach for the New Orleans Saints of the National Football League (NFL).

Coaching career 
He was previously the tight ends coach and running backs coach for the Saints and, before that, the offensive coordinator at Michigan State.  Roushar has served as an assistant coach with several teams, beginning in 1986 as the offensive backfield coach with Butler.  He formerly held the offensive coordinator position at Butler, Ball State, Northern Illinois, Illinois, and offensive line coach at Cincinnati.

References

External links

 Michigan State profile
 Illinois profile

1960 births
Living people
Ball State Cardinals football coaches
Butler Bulldogs football coaches
Cincinnati Bearcats football coaches
Illinois Fighting Illini football coaches
Michigan State Spartans football coaches
New Orleans Saints coaches
Northern Illinois Huskies football coaches
Rhode Island Rams football coaches